The National Union of Artists of Ukraine (Spilka khudozhnykiv Ukrainy) which was founded in 1938 is an all-Ukrainian public creative organization of professional artists and art critics. This voluntary creative association consists of painters, graphic artists, sculptors, masters of decorative art and art critics; and is based in Kyiv, the capital city of Ukraine.

Recognition of the Union
On September 7, 1939, the Ukrainian SSR approved the Statute of the Union of Soviet Artists of Ukraine. The charter defined the status of the union as a voluntary organization uniting the workers of fine arts on the territory of the Ukrainian SSR (painters, graphic artists, sculptors, theatre artists, folk art masters), as well as persons conducting research and critical work in this recognised field. In 1998 the Union was awarded its National status. On the initiative of the National Union of Artists of Ukraine and other Ukrainian creative unions, the law on professional creative workers and creative unions have been changed. By decree of the President of Ukraine, a professional holiday named Artists Day which is dedicated to art was established.

Congress
Founded in 1938 (originally named the Union of Soviet Artists of Ukraine) as the republican branch of the Union of Artists of the USSR. The foundation was preceded by five years of preparatory work of a special organizing committee established in 1933 in Kharkiv, which was then the capital of the Ukrainian USSR. The 1st congress was held in Kharkiv, the rest were held in Kyiv.

Congresses
1st - 1938
2nd - 1956
3rd - 1962
4th - 1968
5th - 1973
6th - 1977
7th - 1982

Past chairmen
Here is a list of all presidents of the Union since its creation in 1938.

Notable members
Here is a comprehensive list of notable members from this organisation over the years.

See also
 National Union of Composers of Ukraine

References

Sources
Lobukhov O.M. Union of Artists of Ukraine // Ukrainian Soviet Encyclopedia : 12 tons / head. M.P. Bazhan; redkol.: O.K. Antonov, etc. — 2nd kind. - K. : Main edition of the URE, 1983. — T. 10 : Salyut — Stohiviz. — 543, [1] p., [36] arch. Il. : ill., table, port, maps + 1 arc s. — p. 461.
70th anniversary of the National Union of Artists of Ukraine / redkol.: Chepelyk V.A. and others. ; Order: Voloshchuk I.M., Bokovnya O.V. — Kyiv : National. union skinny. Ukraine, 2009. – 504 p.

Artist cooperatives
Cultural organizations based in Ukraine
Civic and political organizations based in the Soviet Union
1938 establishments in Ukraine
Institutions with the title of National in Ukraine